Queen of the Morning Calm is a 2019 Canadian drama film, directed by Gloria Ui Young Kim. The film stars Tina Jung as Deborah, a single mother in Toronto who is struggling to raise her daughter Mona (Eponine Lee) while the girl's father Sarge (Jesse LaVercombe) moves in and out of their lives unpredictably and unreliably.

The film was in development for several years. Kim won the Telefilm Canada New Voices Award at the Toronto Screenwriting Conference in 2013 for its screenplay, but struggled to secure sufficient funding to make the film until she won the $200,000 Feature Film Award from Women in the Director's Chair in 2016. The film went into production in November 2018, and had its theatrical premiere at the 2019 Whistler Film Festival.

The film was subsequently screened as part of the 2020 Canadian Film Festival, where it won the awards for William F. White Reel Canadian Indie, Best Director (Kim) and Best Breakout Performance (Lee).

Critical response
For Exclaim!, Angela Morrison praised the film, writing that "The film is technically accomplished and meticulously shot, perfectly capturing the chilly streets, cozy shops and small apartment spaces of Toronto. Scenes of Mona and Debra dragging their belongings through the city streets evoke the alienation and sense of precarity that comes with being a single mother and a sex worker in a big city, experiences that are often excluded within the canon of Toronto-set indie rom-coms (i.e. The F Word, Take This Waltz), a fact that Kim recognizes and begins to rectify in telling this deeply personal, resonant story."

Chris Knight of the National Post rated the film 3.5 stars out of 5, writing that "Queen of the Morning Calm delivers a nuanced portrayal of inner-city Toronto – neither beautiful nor horrifying – and of a young woman trying to make her way in it."

References

External links
 
 Queen of the Morning Calm at Library and Archives Canada

2019 films
2019 drama films
Canadian drama films
Films about Korean Canadians
English-language Canadian films
Films shot in Toronto
Films set in Toronto
2010s English-language films
2010s Canadian films